Owadowia is a genus of extinct thalassochelydian turtle from the Late Jurassic of Poland. The type and only species is Owadowia borsukbialynickae, named by Szczygielski and colleagues in 2017 for a partial lower jaw, coracoid, ilium and femur from the early Tithonian Kcynia Formation. The limited material means that it is difficult to compare Owadowia to its relatives, and it may not be a unique taxon. The genus lacks the features diagnostic to its parent clade Thalassochelydia, has similarities to Solnhofia and Portlandemys as well as being a Late Jurassic marine turtle like the remainder of the group.

References

Thalassochelydia
Prehistoric turtle genera
Tithonian genera
Late Jurassic turtles
Late Jurassic reptiles of Europe
Fossils of Poland
Fossil taxa described in 2017